"The Meaning of Love" is the second single from Pop Idol winner Michelle McManus, released on 26 January 2004. It did not match the success of her chart-topping debut single "All This Time", reaching number 16 in the UK and number 29 in Ireland. Soon after the single's commercial failure, BMG dropped McManus from the label.

Music video
The music video premiered in the United Kingdom in January 2004. It shows a man and a woman arguing before they make up and settle their argument.

Reception
Daily Record critic John Dingwall called the song a "great ballad"; a colleague of his, however, wrote: "Michelle's going to have to aim much higher... 'The Meaning of Love', while good, isn't great." AllMusic journalist Sharon Mawer described the track as "a charity sounding record without the All Saints rhythm [of 'All This Time'], without the multi-vocals, and without much of a tune either".

Commercial performance
"The Meaning of Love" debuted at #16 in the United Kingdom and number 29 in Ireland. The single did not chart as well as expected. It spent four weeks in the UK Top 75 and three weeks in the Irish Top 100. Considered a flop, with sales of only 8,000, the media drew comparisons of McManus' fortunes to Popstars: The Rivals rejects One True Voice.

Track listing
UK CD single

 "The Meaning of Love" (Radio edit)
 "Believe"
 "Tell Me Now"
 "The Meaning Of Love" (Enhanced Section including music video)

UK Digital download

1. "The Meaning of Love" (album version)

Weekly-charts

References

2004 singles
Michelle McManus songs
2004 songs
Songs written by Karen Poole
Songs written by Steve Robson